Badaun district is one of the districts of Uttar Pradesh state of India, and Badaun town is the district headquarters. Badaun district is a part of Bareilly division. The district covers an area of 4234 km2. According to the (District Badaun,  Govt. Of Uttar Pradesh) mythological stories, Badaun was named after Ahir prince Budh.

History 

After the original British takeover in 1801, this area was part of Moradabad district, although parts were then transferred into Bareilly district in 1805. Then in October 1823, the district was created out of areas previously in both Moradabad and Bareilly districts, and it was originally called Sahaswan district after its headquarters of Sahaswan. The headquarters were moved to Budaun in 1838.

The Encyclopædia Britannica Eleventh Edition wrote of Budaun: 

It has been noted by Prof. Goti John that this city was named  "Bedamooth" (बेदामूथ) in an ancient inscription (stone writeup, शिलालेख.) (inscription at Lucknow Museum). Then this region was called Panchal (पांचाल). According to the lines on Stone Writeup there was a village "Bhadaunlak" near the city. A Muslim Historian (इतिहासकार) Mr. Roz Khan Lodhi said that here the Ashoka - The Great built a Buddh Vihar & Quila (किला) and he named it BuddhMau (बुद्धमउ). Geographically Badaun City is located near holy river Ganges (गंगा).

Economy
In 2006 the Ministry of Panchayati Raj named Budaun one of the country's 251 special funded cities (out of a total of 640). It is one of the 34 districts in Uttar Pradesh currently receiving funds from the Backward Regions Grant Fund Programme (BRGF) In The Badaun.

Divisions
The district comprises five tehsils: Budaun, Bisauli, Bilsi, Dataganj and Sahaswaan.

There are six Vidhan Sabha constituencies in this district: Bisauli, Sahaswan, Bilsi, Badaun, Shekhupur and Dataganj. While Shekhupur and Dataganj are part of Aonla Lok Sabha constituency, rest are part of Badaun Lok Sabha constituency.

Demographics
According to the 2011 census Budaun district has a population of 3,681,896, roughly equal to the nation of Liberia or the US state of Oklahoma. This gives it a ranking of 71st in India (out of a total of 640). Its population growth rate over the decade 2001-2011 was 20.96%. Badaun has a sex ratio of 859 females for every 1000 males, and a literacy rate of 52.91%. After bifurcation, the district had a population of 3,127,621. Scheduled Castes make up 553,497 (17.70%) of the population.

The major urban areas In the district according to March 2015 estimates are Budaun (3.97 lacs pop.), Ujhani (1.24 lacs pop.), Sahaswan (1.18 lacs pop.) and Kakrala (0.85 lacs pop.)

About 27% population of Budaun district is urban, 28% suburban and remaining 45% rural.

Religion

The majority of the population residing in Budaun is mainly from the two religions Hinduism and Islam. Moreover, Sikhs, Christians and Jains are also some other practiced religions in the region.

Language

At the time of the 2011 Census of India, 89.98% of the population of the district spoke Hindi and 9.93% Urdu as their first language.

Major settlements

Budaun
Bisauli
Sahaswan
Ujhani
Kakrala
Bilsi
Islamnagar
Dataganj

Villages
 

Hansigunj

Notable people 

 Inayat Hussain Khan, Indian classical vocalist

References

External links

 
Districts of Uttar Pradesh
Minority Concentrated Districts in India